The European Trade Union Committee for Education - ETUCE is a European trade union federation based in Brussels. It represents 132 education sector unions in 51 countries, with a total membership of approximately 11 million members. The ETUCE is the European regional structure of Education International. The trade union committee is a member of the European Trade Union Confederation.

See also 
 Education International
 European Trade Union Confederation

References

External links 

European Trade Union Confederation